Cinnamomum cassia, called Chinese cassia or Chinese cinnamon, is an evergreen tree originating in southern China and widely cultivated there and elsewhere in South and Southeast Asia. It is one of several species of Cinnamomum used primarily for its aromatic bark, which is used as a spice. The buds are also used as a spice, especially in India, and were used by the ancient Romans.

Description 

Origin and types

Chinese cassia is a close relative to Ceylon cinnamon (C. verum), Saigon cinnamon (C. loureiroi), Indonesian cinnamon (C. burmannii), and Malabar cinnamon (C. citriodorum). In all five species, the dried bark is used as a spice. Chinese cassia's flavor is less delicate than that of Ceylon cinnamon. Its bark is thicker, more difficult to crush, and has a rougher texture than that of Ceylon cinnamon. Cassia cinnamon is the most popular variety of cinnamon sold and consumed in North America. 

Chinese cassia is produced in both China and Vietnam. Until the 1960s, Vietnam was the world's most important producer of Saigon cinnamon, which has a higher oil content, and consequently has a stronger flavor. Because of the disruption caused by the Vietnam War, however, production of Indonesian cassia in the highlands of the Indonesian island of Sumatra was increased to meet demand. Indonesian cassia has the lowest oil content of the three types of cassia, so commands the lowest price. Chinese cassia has a sweeter flavor than Indonesian cassia, similar to Saigon cinnamon, but with lower oil content.

Uses

Spice 
Cassia bark (both powdered and in whole or "stick" form) is used as a flavoring agent for confectionery, desserts, pastries, and meat; it is specified in many curry recipes, where Ceylon cinnamon is less suitable. Traditionally, the bark is stripped off the tree and dried in the shade. After drying, it is thinly sliced for use or ground into a powder. Essential oils made from the stripped bark have many uses, such as in health products, food and drinks. Cassia is sometimes added to Ceylon cinnamon but is a much thicker, coarser product. Cassia is sold as pieces of bark or as neat quills or sticks. Cassia sticks can be distinguished from Ceylon cinnamon sticks in this manner: Ceylon cinnamon sticks have many thin layers and can easily be made into powder using a coffee or spice grinder, whereas cassia sticks are extremely hard and are usually made up of one thick layer.

Cassia buds, although rare, are also occasionally used as a spice. They resemble cloves in appearance and have a mild, flowery cinnamon flavor. Cassia buds are primarily used in old-fashioned pickling recipes, marinades, and teas.

Traditional medicine and phytochemicals 

The part of the bark that is used to make spices is called the Cinnamomi cortex. Chinese cassia (called ròuguì; 肉桂 in Chinese) is produced primarily in the southern provinces of Guangxi, Guangdong, and Yunnan. It is considered one of the 50 fundamental herbs in traditional Chinese medicine. More than 160 phytochemicals have been isolated from Cinnamomum cassia.

The blood-thinning component called coumarin found in C. cassia could damage the liver if consumed in larger amounts, therefore European health agencies have warned against consuming high amounts of cassia. Other bioactive compounds found in the bark, powder and essential oils of C. cassia are cinnamaldehyde and styrene. In high doses, these substances can also be toxic for humans.

History
A mention by Chinese herbalists suggests that cassia bark was used by humans at least as far back as 2700 B.C. It was a treatment for diarrhea, fevers, and menstrual issues. The Ayurvedic healers of India used it as well to treat similar ailments.

Cassia cinnamon was brought to Egypt around 500 B.C. where it became a valued additive to their embalming mixtures. The Bible suggests that it was part of the anointing oil used by Moses. The Greeks, Romans and ancient Hebrews were the first to use cassia bark as a cooking spice. They also made perfumes with it and used it for medicinal purposes. Cinnamon migrated with the Romans. It was established for culinary use by the 17th century in Europe.

See also
Chinese herbology

References

Further reading
Dalby, Andrew (1996). Siren Feasts: A History of Food and Gastronomy in Greece. London: Routledge.
Faure, Paul (1987). Parfums et aromates de l'antiquité. Paris: Fayard.
Paszthoty, Emmerich (1992). Salben, Schminken und Parfüme im Altertum. Mainz, Germany:  Zabern.
Paterson, Wilma (1990). A Fountain of Gardens:  Plants and Herbs from the Bible. Edinburgh.

External links
List of Chemicals in Cassia (Dr. Duke's Databases)

cassia
Spices
Plants used in traditional Chinese medicine
Trees of China
Endemic flora of China